Dicella is a genus in the Malpighiaceae, a family of about 75 genera of flowering plants in the order Malpighiales. Dicella includes seven species, assigned to two sections. Section Dicella comprises D. bracteosa and D. nucifera, found in southeastern Brazil and adjacent Paraguay and Argentina. Section Macropterys includes D. aciculifera, known only from Costa Rica, and D. conwayi, D. julianii, D. macroptera, and D. oliveirae, all of South America from Colombia south to about 19°S

External links and references
 Malpighiaceae Malpighiaceae - description, taxonomy, phylogeny, and nomenclature
Dicella
Chase, M. W. 1981. A revision of Dicella (Malpighiaceae). Systematic Botany 6: 159–171.
Anderson, W. R. 1997. Notes on neotropical Malpighiaceae-VI. Contributions from the University of Michigan Herbarium 21: 37–84.

Malpighiaceae
Malpighiaceae genera